ANV can refer to:

 Acción Nacionalista Vasca (a historical Basque nationalist party)
 anticipatory nausea and vomiting, a common consequence of cancer treatment (see: Cancer and nausea#Anticipatory)
 Army of Northern Virginia
 Anvik Airport in Anvik, Alaska (IATA Code: ANV)